Ocean Andrew is an American politician and businessman serving as a member of the Wyoming House of Representatives from the 46th district. Elected in November 2020, he assumed office on January 4, 2021.

Early life and education 
Andrew was born and raised in Wenatchee, Washington. He earned an Associate of Arts and Sciences from Wenatchee Valley College and a Bachelor of Science degree in energy resource management and development from the University of Wyoming.

Career 
In 2011, Andrew began working as a commercial fishing deckhand in Naknek, Alaska. He also worked as a skid-steer loader operator. After working as a lift driver for Walmart in Cheyenne, Wyoming, Andrew opened a fish and chip food truck in Laramie. In 2021 he invited Florida Congressman Matt Gaetz to speak in Cheyenne against Liz Cheney's vote for the Impeachment of Donald Trump.

References 

Living people
People from Wenatchee, Washington
University of Wyoming alumni
Republican Party members of the Wyoming House of Representatives
Year of birth missing (living people)